The term food system describes the interconnected systems and processes that influence nutrition, food, health, community development, and agriculture. A food system includes all processes and infrastructure involved in feeding a population: growing, harvesting, processing, packaging, transporting, marketing, consumption, distribution, and disposal of food and food-related items. It also includes the inputs needed and outputs generated at each of these steps. Food systems fall within agri-food systems, which encompass the entire range of actors and their interlinked value-adding activities in the primary production of food and non-food agricultural products, as well as in food storage, aggregation, post-harvest handling, transportation, processing, distribution, marketing, disposal, and consumption. A food system operates within and is influenced by social, political, economic, and environmental contexts. It also requires human resources that provide labor, research and education. Food systems are either conventional  or alternative according to their model of food lifespan from origin to plate.

According to the IPCC, the global food system, including all of the various industries involved in sustainable and conventional food systems, provide employment for 1 billion people. This global food system is facing a number of challenges created by impeding global food security issues created by climate change and non-climate change stresses on the system. About 34% of total greenhouse gas emissions are attributable to the global food system. In 2020 an EU evidence review found that food system gas emissions are on course to increase by 30–40% by 2050 due to population growth and dietary change. According to FAO, it is crucial to build the resilience of agrifood systems so that they have the capacity over time, in the face of any disruption, to sustainably ensure availability of and access to sufficient, safe and nutritious food for all, and sustain the livelihoods of agrifood systems' actors.

Transitioning to sustainable food systems is critical for addressing global challenges such as climate change, hunger, biodiversity loss, and deforestation.  Addressing issues at each stage in the system, can have system-wide effects for 30-40 percent of food produced is lost from post-harvest up to retail and the consumer. Reducing food waste then reduces the environmental impacts of agriculture, such as land use impacts, and reducing food prices or preventing shortages. International policy has increasingly approached policy from a food systems perspective: Sustainable Development Goal 2: Zero Hunger and Sustainable Development Goal 12: "responsible consumption and production" focus on sustainable food systems and Sustainable and in September 2021 the United Nations hosted the first Food Systems Summit.

Conventional food systems
Conventional food systems operate on economies of scale. These food systems are geared towards a production model that requires maximizing efficiency in order to lower consumer costs and increase overall production, and they utilize economic models such as vertical integration, economic specialization, and global trade. The growing soil quality degradation, climate change, and growing world population put pressure on agricultural land, leading to innovations to increase agricultural productivity on the limited available land and urban space. Though conventional farming practices have increased crop yield through the use of climate-smart agriculture (CSA), smallholder farming systems and limited knowledge of CSA remain constraints for enjoying economies of scale and sustainable crop production and food security.

The term “conventional” when describing food systems is largely due to comparisons made to it by proponents of other food systems, collectively known as alternative food systems.

History of conventional food systems

The development of food systems can be traced back to the origins of in-situ agriculture and the production of food surpluses. These surpluses enabled the development of settled areas and contributed to the development of ancient civilizations, particularly those in the Fertile Crescent. The system of trade associated with the exchange of foodstuffs also emerged in East Asia, North America, South America, and Subsaharan Africa with common commodities of exchange such as salt, spices, fish, grains, etc. Through events in world history such as the conquests of Alexander the Great, the Crusades, the expansion of Islam, the journeys of Marco Polo, and the exploration and colonization of the Americas by Europeans led to the introduction and redistribution of new foods to the world at large, and food systems began to intermingle on a global scale. After World War II, the advent of industrialized agriculture and more robust global trade mechanisms have evolved into the models of food production, presentation, delivery, and disposal that characterize conventional food systems today.

Impacts of conventional food systems

Lower food costs and greater food variety can be directly attributed to the evolution of conventional food systems. Agronomic efficiency is driven by the necessity to constantly lower production expenses, and those savings can then be passed on to the consumer. Also, the advent of industrial agriculture and the infrastructure built around conventional food systems has enabled the world population to expand beyond the "Malthusian catastrophe" limitations. According to the IPCC, food supply per capita has increased by more than 30% since 1961.

However, conventional food systems are largely based on the availability of inexpensive fossil fuels, which is necessary for mechanized agriculture, the manufacture or collection of chemical fertilizers, the processing of food products, and the packaging of the foods.  The increase in the availability of food since 1961 has primarily been driven by an 800% increase in the use of nitrogen fertilizers (which are fossil fuel dependent) and high water usage (an increase of over 100% since 1961).

The impacts of these intense resource processes are many a varied: food processing began when the number of consumers started proliferating. The demand for cheap and efficient calories climbed, resulting in nutrition decline; and industrialized agriculture, due to its reliance on economies of scale to reduce production costs, often leads to the compromising of local, regional, or even global ecosystems through fertilizer runoff, nonpoint source pollution, and greenhouse gas emission.

The need to reduce production costs in an increasingly global market can cause the production of foods to be moved to areas where economic costs (labor, taxes, etc.) are lower or environmental regulations are laxer, which are usually further from consumer markets. For example, the majority of salmon sold in the United States is raised off the coast of Chile, due in large part to less stringent Chilean standards regarding fish feed and regardless of the fact that salmon are not indigenous in Chilean coastal waters. The globalization of food production can result in the loss of traditional food systems in less developed countries, and have negative impacts on the population health, ecosystems, and cultures in those countries. As a result of these forces, 2018 estimates suggest that 821 million people are currently undernourished, and 2 billion adults are overweight and obese.

The issue of having minimal access to food, or access to primarily unhealthy food, is often described in terms of food security. The 1996 World Food Summit defined food security as a state in which "all people, at all times, have physical and economic access to sufficient, safe and nutritious food to meet their dietary needs and food preferences for an active and healthy life. " Many groups argue that food security is largely determined by a given person's socioeconomic status, race, ethnicity, or other socially defined categories, making food access a social justice issue. This has given rise to numerous social movements whose goal is to increase access to healthy and culturally appropriate foods, among a wide variety of groups. These movements are often described as belonging to a more significant food justice movement.

Scientists estimated the extensive pesticide pollution risks worldwide with a new environmental model and found that a third of global agricultural land is at high risk for such pollution, of which a third are high-biodiversity regions.

Sustainable food systems

Local food systems

Local food systems are networks of food production and consumption that aim to be geographically and economically accessible and direct. They contrast to industrial food systems by operating with reduced food transportation and more direct marketing, leading to fewer people between the farmer and the consumer. As a result, relationships that are developed in local food systems emerge from face-to-face interactions, potentially leading to a stronger sense of trust and social connectedness between actors. In addition to this, consumers can also encourage farmers to be environmentally friendly by teaching them about practices such as organic farming. As a result, some scholars suggest that local food systems are a good way to revitalize a community. The decreased distance of food transportation has also been promoted for its environmental benefits. Also, farmers can enjoy a better quality of life because producing healthier food will allow them to be paid more, and not live under the poverty line.

Both proponents and critics of local food systems warn that they can lead to narrow inward-looking attitudes or ‘local food patriotism’, and that price premiums and local food cultures can be elitist and exclusive. In contrast, many food sovereignty activists argue that local production of food is essential to achieving food security, especially among indigenous communities, and thus are crucial to the public health of those communities.

Examples of local food systems include community-supported agriculture, farmers markets and farm to school programs. They have been associated with the 100 Mile Diet and Low Carbon Diet, as well as the slow food movement. The food sovereignty movement is also related to local food production. Food sovereignty activists argue that local communities should not only have access to nutritious and culturally appropriate foods, but that those communities should also be able to define the means by which their food is produced. Various forms of urban agriculture locate food production in densely populated areas not traditionally associated with farming. Garden sharing, where urban and suburban homeowners offer land access to food growers in exchange for a share of the harvest, is a relatively new trend, at the extreme end of direct local food production.

An FAO study on food transport networks of 90 countries finds that where food is transported more locally and where the network is denser – such as in high-income countries and densely populated countries like China, India, Nigeria and Pakistan –, systematic disturbances (i.e., adverse events), have a much lower impact on increases in travel time and food costs than where food is transported further distances.

Organic food systems

Organic food systems are characterized by a reduced dependence on chemical inputs and an increased concern for transparency and information. Organic produce is grown without the chemical pesticides and fertilizers of industrial food systems, and livestock is reared without the use of antibiotics or growth hormones. The reduced inputs of organic agriculture can also lead to a greater reliance on local knowledge, creating a stronger knowledge community amongst farmers. The transparency of food information is vital for organic food systems as a means through which consumers are able to identify organic food. As a result, a variety of certification bodies have emerged in organic food systems that set the standards for organic identification. Organic agriculture is promoted for the ecological benefits of reduced chemical application, the health benefits of lower chemical consumption, the economic benefits that accrue to farmers through a price premium, and the social benefits of increased transparency in the food system.

Organic food systems have been criticized for being elitist and inaccessible like local food systems. Critics have also suggested that organic agriculture has been conventionalized such that it mimics industrial food systems using pesticides and fertilizers that are organically derived

Cooperatives in food systems

Cooperatives can exist both at the farmer end of food production and the consumer end. Farming cooperatives refer to arrangements where farmers pool resources, either to cultivate their crops or get their crops to market. Consumer cooperatives often refer to food cooperatives where members buy a share in the store. Cooperative grocery stores, unlike corporate grocery stores, are socially owned, and thus surpluses cannot be taken from the store as profit. As a result, food co-ops do not work for profit, potentially keeping prices more cost representative. Other forms of cooperatives that have developed more recently include community-supported agriculture, where community members buy a share in a farm's harvest, and may also be engaged in farm labor, operating at both the consumer and producer end of food systems. Garden sharing pairs individual landowners and food growers, while variations on this approach organize groups of food gardeners for mutual assistance.

Producer associations and cooperatives reinforce small-scale agricultural producers’ livelihoods by allowing the pooling of resources to achieve scale, facilitating access to productive resources, and enhancing  marketing power. Coordination with other actors is also key to managing market risks. Mutual benefits can be achieved, for example, through forwarding contracts: farmers receive guaranteed prices for their outputs regardless of market conditions, while processors and distributors receive products of a desired quality. For farming cooperatives that share resources, the burden of investment is disbursed to all members rather than being concentrated in a single individual. A criticism of cooperatives is that reduced competition can reduce efficiency

Alternative food systems
Alternative food systems refer to resilient foods or emergency foods, which can be defined as those foods, food production methods or interventions that would allow for significant food availability in the face of a global catastrophic food shock (GCFS). An expected 345.2 million people projected to be food insecure in 2023 – more than double the number in 2020, but a global catastrophe such as nuclear winter could threaten billions with mass starvation. Several studies have argued resilient food could provide the calories to support the global population even without agriculture. According to the book Feeding Everyone No Matter What and peer-reviewed study paths to a full solution include: global-scale conversion including natural gas-digesting bacteria (single cell protein), extracting food from leaves, and conversion of fiber by enzymes, mushroom or bacteria growth, or a two-step process involving partial decomposition of fiber by fungi and/or bacteria and feeding them to animals such as beetles, ruminants (cattle, sheep, etc.), rats and chickens. Most alternative food work covers carbohydrates and protein, but there are also ways to make synthetic fat. By mixing many alternative foods micro-nutrient balance is possible. Substantially more research is needed in this area to realize resilient food systems for the globe and even wealthy nations.

Fair trade

Fair trade has emerged in global food systems to create a more excellent balance between food price and the cost of producing it. It is mainly defined by more direct trading and communication systems whereby producers have greater control over the conditions of trade and garner a greater fraction of the sale price. The main goal of Fair Trade is to "change international commercial
relations in such a way that disadvantaged producers can increase their control over their own future, have a fair and just return for their work, continuity of income and decent working and living conditions through sustainable development"  Like organic food systems, fair trade relies on transparency and the flow of information. Well-known examples of fair trade commodities are coffee and cocoa.

Novel agricultural technologies

Vertical farms, automation, solar energy production, novel alternatives to pesticides, online food delivery ICTs, and other technologies may allow to localize or modify food production alongside policies such as eco-tariffs, targeted subsidies and meat taxes.

Climate change

Effects of climate change 
The IPCC Special Report on Climate Change and Land describes the current global food system as potentially having major food security risks due to changes created by climate change, including changing local weather conditions, socioeconomic effects of climate change, vulnerability of certain types of agriculture (such as pastoral) and changes in diets due to availability.

Effects on climate change 

The food system is one of the largest sources of greenhouse gas emissions, attributable for between 21 and 37% of global emissions. In 2020, an evidence review for the European Union's Scientific Advice Mechanism found that, without significant change, emissions would increase by 30–40% by 2050 due to population growth and changing consumption patterns, and concluded that "the combined environmental cost of food production is estimated to amount to some $12 trillion per year, increasing to $16 trillion by 2050". Another 2020 study concluded that reducing emissions from the global food system to be essential for achieving the Paris Agreement's climate goals.

The IPCC's and the EU's reports concluded that adapting the food system to reduce greenhouse gas emissions impacts and food security concerns, while shifting towards a sustainable diet, is feasible .

Public policy

European Union 
The European Union's Scientific Advice Mechanism has published a systematic review of all European policies related to sustainable food systems, and their analyses in the academic literature.

In , the EU's Chief Scientific Advisors stated that adapting the European food system for the future should be a high priority for the EU:

In , the EU put improvements to the food system at the core of the European Green Deal. The European Commission's 'Farm to Fork strategy for a sustainable food system', due to be published in spring 2020, is expected to lay out how European countries will reduce greenhouse gas emissions, protect biodiversity, reduce food waste and chemical pesticide use, and contribute to a circular economy.

In , the EU's Scientific Advice Mechanism delivered to European Commissioners a Scientific Opinion on how to transition to a sustainable food system, informed by an evidence review report undertaken by European academies.

Transparency

Transparency within food systems refers to the full disclosure of information about rules, procedures, and practices at all levels within a food production and supply chain. Transparency ensures that consumers have detailed information about the production of a given food item. Traceability, by contrast, is the ability to trace to their origins all components in a food production and marketing chain, whether processed or unprocessed (e.g., meat, vegetables) foods. Concerns about transparency and traceability have been heightened with food safety scares such as bovine spongiform encephalopathy (BSE) and Escherichia coli (E. coli), but do not exclusively refer to food safety. Transparency is also important in identifying foods that possess extrinsic qualities that do not affect the nature of the food per se, but affect its production, such as animal welfare, social justice issues, and environmental concerns.

One of the primary ways transparency is achieved is through certification and/or the use of food labels. In the United States, some certification originates in the public sector, such as the United States Department of Agriculture (USDA) Organic label. Others have their origin in private sector  certification (e.g., Humanely Raised, Certified Humane). Some labels do not rely on certification, such as the USDA's Country of Origin Label (COOL).

Participation in local food systems such as Community Supported Agriculture (CSA), Farmers Markets, food cooperatives, and farmer cooperatives also enhances transparency. Diverse program are promoting purchase of locally grown and marketed foods.

Labeling

See also

Agricultural value chain
Agroecology
Aquaculture
Animal welfare
Cellular agriculture
Factory farming
Fair Trade Certification
Food safety
Food security
Food chain
Food industry
Johns Hopkins Center for a Livable Future
Industrial agriculture
Organic certification
Organic food
Organic farming
National Animal Identification System
Sustainable agriculture
Traceability

Sources

Notes and references

External links
 Univ. of Wisconsin - Agroecology
 UC Santa Cruz Center for Agroecology & Sustainable Food Systems
 Food for the Cities initiative of the Food and Agriculture Organization of the United Nations (FAO)

Agronomy
Agricultural economics
Food and the environment